The 2012 Bowling Green Falcons football team represented Bowling Green State University in the 2012 NCAA Division I FBS football season. They were led by fourth year head coach Dave Clawson and played their home games at Doyt Perry Stadium. They were a member of the East Division of the Mid-American Conference. They finished the season 8–5, 6–2 in MAC play to finish in second place in the East Division. They were invited to the Military Bowl where they were defeated by San Jose State.

Schedule

Game summaries

@ Florida

Idaho

@ Toledo

@ Virginia Tech

Rhode Island

@ Akron

Miami (OH)

@ Massachusetts

Eastern Michigan

@ Ohio

Kent State

vs Buffalo

San Jose State–Military Bowl

References

Bowling Green
Bowling Green Falcons football seasons
Bowling Green Falcons football